Tiro de Gracia is a Chilean Hip-Hop group formed by the MC's: Lenwa Dura and Zaturno

"Tiro de Gracia" was known for their raw lyrical style. They initially performed using cassette tapes looped by "DJ Raff" former member of "La Pozze Latina". During this time the group recorded two independent albums titled "Arma Calibrada" and "Homosapiens", which were distributed hand to hand on the local hip hop scene. "Tiro de Gracia" started getting notoriety for their live performances. At the beginning of 1996 the group was featured on a Hip Hop TV show, which opened up the doors for their first major deal. Within six months, the group had a new demo titled "El Demo Final" with "Juan Sativo", "Lengua Dura", "Zaturno", "Adonai", "Camilo", and featured artists such as "Quique Neira", "Joe Vasconcellos", "Los Tetas", "Carlos Cabezas",  "Ema Pinto", "Pedro Foncea", "DJ Notsag" y "DJ Barsa". The demo was presented to EMI music group, and by November the group had signed their first major deal. "Ser humano" was released on 1997 after three months of recording.
They first gained mainstream popularity in 1997, thanks to their hit "El Juego Verdadero" ("The real game"), and are also known for many other recordings, such as "Viaje Sin Rumbo", "Melaza" and "Chupacabras".

The group split again in 2019 after an argument between two founding members, Juan Sativo and Lenwa Dura.

Discography
 Ser humano!! (1997)
 Decisión (1999)
 Retorno de Misericordia (2001)
 Patrón del Vicio (2003)
 Impacto Certero (2004)
 Música de Vida (2010)

References

External links
Enciclopedia de Música Popular Chilena (spanish)
Enciclopedia del Rock (spanish)

Chilean hip hop groups
Musical groups established in 1993
Musical groups disestablished in 2007
Musical groups reestablished in 2007
Musical groups disestablished in 2019